"Country Song", also known as "The Red Queen Theme", is an untitled country-styled song by Pink Floyd.

History
David Gilmour provides the lead vocals (though the remastered Zabriskie Point soundtrack booklet incorrectly states that Roger Waters is providing the lead vocal, though he does share vocals in unison with Gilmour in the chorus sections). It was originally meant to be on the soundtrack to the film Zabriskie Point, but Michelangelo Antonioni didn't want it in the film. However, it can be found on the second disc from the soundtrack album's 1997 reissue. The song uses chess terms as metaphors.

Versions of this song were called "The Red Queen Theme", possibly referring to the Red Queen character from Through the Looking-Glass.

References

Pink Floyd songs
Songs written by David Gilmour
Songs written by Nick Mason
Songs written by Roger Waters
Songs written by Richard Wright (musician)
Music based on Alice in Wonderland
British hard rock songs
Country rock songs